Antares is a star in the constellation Scorpius.

Antares may also refer to:

Arts and media

Fiction
 Antares (film), a 2004 Austrian film
 Antares, a spaceship in Defying Gravity
 Antares (comics), a Franc-Belgian graphic novel
 Antares, a character in the anime Galaxy Express 999

Music
 Antares (band), a Eurodance act from the mid-1990s
 Antares (album), the debut album of Chinese singer Kris Wu
 Antares, a composition by Hale A. VanderCook

Science
 ANTARES (accelerator), a particle accelerator in Australia
 ANTARES (telescope), in the Mediterranean
 Antares Astronomical Observatory, in Brazil

Transportation
 Antares (rocket), an space launch system
 Antares 20E, a motor glider produced by Lange Aviation GmbH
 FV Antares, a Scottish fishing boat sunk by the Royal Navy submarine HMS Trenchant
 Antares MA-32 series of ultralight trikes
 LM-8 Antares, the Lunar Module of Apollo 14
 , more than one US Navy ship
 , a cargo ship of the United States Navys Military Sealift Command
 Oldsmobile Antares, a car

Other uses
 Antares, Arizona, US
 Småland, a Swedish historical province that took Antares as its symbol
 Antarès, a sports arena in Le Mans, France
 RC Antares, a rugby club in Kyiv, Ukraine

See also

 
 Antarea, a fictional planet in the film Cocoon
 Antar (disambiguation)